Mississippi Highway 340 (MS 340) is a west–east state highway in Chickasaw County, Mississippi, running from the Calhoun County line to MS 15 in Woodland.

Route description

MS 340 begins at the Calhoun County line, directly beside a small reservoir. It heads east as an unsigned, locally maintained dirt road (County Road 407, CR 407) for nearly  through rural farmland to an intersection with MS 341, which it becomes concurrent with MS 341 and state maintenance begins. The two wind their way south as a paved two-lane highway through some wooded hills before MS 341 splits off and heads south toward Hohenlinden, with MS 340 becoming signed as it heads east. MS 340 travels northeastward through a mix of farmland and wooded areas for several miles to enter the village of Woodland along Market Street. It makes a sharp right onto Logan Street at the center of town, continuing 0.4 miles before coming to an end at an intersection with MS 15 at the eastern edge of the village.

Major intersections

References

External links

340
Transportation in Chickasaw County, Mississippi